Gibbons Memorial Park, also known as Honesdale Star Park, is a park in Honesdale, Pennsylvania with a 30-foot star in the center.

The park 

The park is dedicated as a memorial to a past mayor, Austin Flint Gibbons, and to his parents Dr. and Mrs. Peter S. Gibbons. The actual park that the star is in lies at the top of a winding wooded road. Perched on top of Irving Cliff, the highest mountain overlooking the town, the park is surrounded by a large fence that wraps around the premises.

Lent and Easter 
During the 40 days leading up to Easter, otherwise known as Lent, the star that watches the town disappears and is replaced by another image.  A towering Christian cross is instead displayed over the town.

The cross has been permanently removed due to a First Amendment challenge.

References

Honesdale, Pennsylvania
Parks in Wayne County, Pennsylvania